is a Japanese football player. He plays for Cerezo Osaka.

Career
Aki Arimizu joined J1 League club Cerezo Osaka in 2017.

References

External links

1999 births
Living people
Association football people from Osaka Prefecture
Japanese footballers
J1 League players
Cerezo Osaka players
Association football midfielders